Eastern City Gate of Belgrade оr Istočna Kapija Beograda is a complex of three large residential buildings situated near the E-75 motorway in Belgrade, the capital of Serbia, and is among the most prominent structures along the Belgrade skyline. The complex, which is officially named Rudo, was finished in 1976 and is considered one of the symbols of the city, and of the Yugoslav Socialism in general.

Location 
The Eastern Gate is located in the neighborhood of Konjarnik, north of the European route E75, in the municipality of Zvezdara. It is situated in the eastern extension of the neighborhood, between Učiteljsko Naselje and Mali Mokri Lug.

Architecture 
Eastern Gate was constructed from 1973 to 1976. The buildings were designed by architect Vera Ćirković and civil engineer Milutin Jerotijević. The complex consists of three buildings and each of them has 28 storeys and 190 apartments. Just like its western counterpart, the Western City Gate, it was built in the brutalist style.

All three buildings are step-like and triangular shaped, built in a circle so it always visually appears than one is between the other two. Buildings, styled Rudo 1, Rudo 2 and Rudo 3, were settled in 1976, but never fully completed, as the facade wasn't finished. Since the 1990s, due to the lack of maintenance, buildings were known for elevator and water pumps problems. Partial repairs began in 2001, continued in 2004 and intensified in May 2008, mostly concerning the elevators, pumps and terraces.

In 2010, the tenants began collecting funds for the further repairs and in 2012 they started an initiative to fix the problems with the facades. By 2013, concrete chunks up to  began to fall off the buildings. Experts from the University of Belgrade Faculty of Civil Engineering described the facade as being in "extremely bad shape". It was estimated that to repair the facade to modern standards it would cost €4 million. By that point, the tenants and the municipality collected only €110,000. They also had talks with the state government, but they refused to allow the construction of the plain facade as the energy efficient one is obligatory by the new laws.

See also 
Gates of Belgrade

References 

Buildings and structures in Belgrade
Residential buildings in Serbia
Yugoslav Serbian architecture
 Buildings and structures completed in 1976
 Skyscrapers in Serbia
Zvezdara